Grapholita gypsothicta is a species of moth of the  family Tortricidae. It is found in the Democratic Republic of Congo.

References

Moths described in 1938
Grapholitini
Endemic fauna of the Democratic Republic of the Congo